"Faith" is a song by American singer Stevie Wonder featuring fellow American singer Ariana Grande. It serves as the lead single from the soundtrack of the 2016 musical-animated film Sing. The song was written by Francis Farewell Starlite and producers Ryan Tedder and Benny Blanco. The single was released on November 4, 2016.

Background
The song was announced to be the first single from Sing: Original Motion Picture Soundtrack, with Wonder contributing lead vocals and featuring Ariana Grande. The song was nominated for Best Original Song at the 74th Golden Globe Awards. The music video was released in December 2016.

The music video for the song features Wonder singing at the piano and Grande singing as she walks on a sidewalk, alongside animated graffiti populated by characters from the Sing movie. The video was directed by Alan Bibby.

Charts

Certifications

Release history

References

2016 songs
2016 singles
Stevie Wonder songs
Ariana Grande songs
Songs written for films
Songs written for animated films
Songs written by Ariana Grande
Songs written by Ryan Tedder
Songs written by Stevie Wonder
Songs written by Benny Blanco
Song recordings produced by Benny Blanco
Song recordings produced by Ryan Tedder
Universal Records singles
Republic Records singles
Number-one singles in Israel